Jake Daniel Elliott (born January 21, 1995) is an American football placekicker for the Philadelphia Eagles of the National Football League (NFL). He played college football at Memphis. He was part of the Eagles' Super Bowl LII championship team against the New England Patriots.

Early life
Elliott was born in Western Springs, Illinois, to Bruce and Diane 
Elliott. As a youth, he excelled in many sports, including baseball, basketball, and tennis. He was considered among the state's best youth tennis players.

High school career
Elliott, who attended Lyons Township High School in La Grange, Illinois, began playing football when a Lyons assistant coach noticed his talent at a Homecoming student field goal kicking contest. Before this, he played tennis for three years at Lyons Township. Preceding his junior-year season, he was an ESPNHS underclass and named First-team All-State by the Chicago Tribune. During his junior season, he made a 52-yard field goal with no time remaining to beat Oak-Park River Forest High School, 16–14. As a senior, he made 15 of 21 field-goal attempts and was named Second-team kicker for Kohl's All America List. After his senior-year season, Elliott was offered a full scholarship by the University of North Dakota and the University of Memphis. He chose to play for the Memphis Tigers.

College career
Elliott attended and played college football for Memphis from 2013–2016. In his time at Memphis, he played under head coaches Justin Fuente, Darrell Dickey, and Mike Norvell.

As a freshman, Elliott was named the starting kicker after summer training. In his 2013 season, Elliott connected on 16 of 18 field goals. After his freshman season, he led the Tigers with 72 points scored (24/24 extra points and 16/18 field goals). He set a Memphis record with his 56-yard field goal at USF, breaking the 2005 record of 53 yards set by Stephen Gostkowski. He was named the American Athletic Conference Special Teams Player of the Week and also one of three players to be named "Stars of the Week" by Lou Groza Award. In Elliott's sophomore year, he led the American Athletic Conference by averaging 9.2 points per game. For the second year in a row, he was named First-team All-Conference and Conference Special Teams Player of the Year. He scored 120 points during his season, making 21 of 32 field goal attempts and converting all 57 extra-point attempts. His 21 successful field goals, 57 extra points, and 120 total points scored led the American Conference. During the 2014 Miami Beach Bowl, Elliott kicked the fourth-longest field goal in bowl game history, a 54-yard attempt that sent the game into a second overtime and led to a 55–48 victory. In the 2015 season, he converted all 63 extra point attempts and 23 of 28 field goal attempts for a team-leading 132 points scored. His 63 extra points and 23 field goals led the conference in the 2015 season. In the 2016 season, he converted all 58 extra point attempts and 21 of 26 field goal attempts for a team-leading 121 points. His 21 field goals tied him with Tulsa's Redford Jones for the conference lead. In his collegiate career, he converted all 202 extra point attempts and 81 of 104 field goal attempts. At the end of the 2016 season, his successful collegiate career ranked him first in total points, extra points, and field goals while also finishing third in field goal percentage in conference history.

Collegiate statistics

Professional career
On February 9, 2017, it was announced that Elliott was entering the 2017 NFL Draft.

Cincinnati Bengals
The Cincinnati Bengals selected Elliott in the fifth round (153rd overall) of the 2017 NFL Draft. He was the first of three kickers selected in 2017. He competed with veteran Randy Bullock for the Bengals' kicker spot. On September 2, 2017, the team announced that Bullock had won the job, and waived Elliott. He was re-signed to the practice squad the next day.

Philadelphia Eagles

On September 12, 2017, the Philadelphia Eagles signed Elliott off the Bengals' practice squad after the Eagles' starting kicker, Caleb Sturgis, was placed on injured reserve. Elliott made his first NFL appearance in Week 2 of the 2017 season against the Kansas City Chiefs. In the game, he converted both extra point attempts and two out of three field goal attempts. On September 24, 2017, at Lincoln Financial Field in Philadelphia, Elliott kicked a 61-yard field goal to beat the New York Giants on the final play of the game, resulting in a 27–24 victory, earning him NFC Special Teams Player of the Week. It was tied for the 7th-longest field goal in NFL history, at the time. It was also the longest field goal in Eagles history, the longest ever kicked in Philadelphia in an NFL game, and the longest ever by an NFL rookie. In Week 4, against the Los Angeles Chargers, he put together a solid performance in converting all four field goal opportunities and both extra point attempts for a season-high 14 points scored. During the Week 11 game against the Dallas Cowboys, Elliott made a tackle during the starting kick return. He would later be pulled out of the game for a head injury and would not return. The Eagles finished with a 13–3 record, won the NFC East, and earned a first-round bye. Against the Atlanta Falcons in the Divisional Round, he missed an extra point but converted three field goal attempts in the 15–10 victory. In the NFC Championship against the Minnesota Vikings, he converted all five extra point attempts and one field goal attempt in the 38–7 victory. During Super Bowl LII on February 4, 2018, Elliott missed his first of two extra point attempts, but made all three of his field goal attempts, including a 46-yard field goal in the fourth quarter that helped seal the Eagles' first Super Bowl victory over the New England Patriots.

In the 2018 season, Elliott converted 33 of 35 extra point attempts and 26 of 31 field goal attempts. In Week 12, against the New York Giants, he hit a go-ahead 43-yard field goal with 22 seconds remaining to be difference in the 25–22 victory. In Week 16, against the Houston Texans, he converted a 35-yard field goal with no time remaining to give the Eagles a 32–30 victory. In the Wild Card Round against the Chicago Bears, he had one extra point and one field goal in the 16–15 victory. In the Divisional Round against the New Orleans Saints, he had two extra points in the 20–14 loss.

In Week 6 of the 2019 season against the Minnesota Vikings, Elliott attempted a pass on a fake field goal attempt that was intercepted by Everson Griffen in the 38–20 loss. On November 27, 2019, Elliot signed a five-year, $21.8 million contract extension with the Eagles through the 2024 season, making him the third-highest paid kicker in the league.

In 2020, Elliott had the least productive season of his career, only attempting 19 field goals (converting 73.7%) and 26 extra-points (converting 92.3%). This was in part due to HC Doug Pederson being more aggressive on 4th downs and 2-point conversions.

In Week 11 of the 2021 season, Elliott went a perfect 8-for-8 on kicks, four field goals and four extra points, in a 40–29 win over the Saints, earning NFC Special Teams Player of the Week. By the end of the season, Elliott finished with his first year of converting 100% of his extra-point attempts, and he broke the Eagles franchise record for the best field goal percentage in a single season at 90.9%. On January 31, 2022, Elliott was named to his first Pro Bowl, replacing Matt Gay whose team had advanced to Super Bowl LVI.

In Week 18 of the 2022 season, was a perfect six-for-six on kicks in a 22-16 win over the Giants to clinch the NFC East title, earning NFC Special Teams Player of the Week. Elliott reached his second career Super Bowl when the Eagles defeated the San Francisco 49ers in the NFC Championship Game. In the Super Bowl, Elliott hit both his field goals but the Eagles lost 38-35 to the Kansas City Chiefs.

NFL records

 Longest field goal by a rookie: 61 yards
 Longest field goal by a rookie in the playoffs: 53 yards
 Longest field goal by a rookie in a Super Bowl: 46 yard

Eagles franchise records
 Best field goal percentage in a season (while playing in every game): 90.9%
 Longest field goal: 61 yards
 Most 50-plus yard field goals made in a season: 5
 Longest field goal in the playoffs: 53 yards
 Longest field goal in a Super Bowl: 46 yards

NFL career statistics

Regular season

|-
! style="text-align:center;"| 2017
! style="text-align:center;background:#afe6ba;"| PHI
| 15 || 26 || 31 || 83.9 || 0 || 61 || 39 || 42 || 92.9 || 84 || 62.0 || 42 || 117
|-
! style="text-align:center;"| 2018
! style="text-align:center;"| PHI
| 16 || 26 || 31 || 83.9 || 0 || 56 || 33 || 35 || 94.3 || 82 || 63.5 || 57 || 111
|-
! style="text-align:center;"| 2019
! style="text-align:center;"| PHI
| 16 || 22 || 26 || 84.6 || 0 || 53 || 35 || 37 || 94.6 || 81 || 62.4 || 52 || 101
|-
! style="text-align:center;"| 2020
! style="text-align:center;"| PHI
| 16 || 14 || 19 || 73.7 || 0 || 54 || 24 || 26 || 92.3 || 73 || 61.8 || 46 || 66
|-
! style="text-align:center;"| 2021
! style="text-align:center;"| PHI
| 17 || 30 || 33 || 90.9 || 1 || 58 || 44 || 44 || 100.0 || 96 || 63.2 || 61 || 134
|-
! style="text-align:center;"| 2022
! style="text-align:center;"| PHI
| 16 || 20 || 23 || 87.0 || 1 || 56 || 51 || 53 || 96.2 || 91 || 64.8 || 63 || 111
|-
|- class="sortbottom"
! colspan=2 | Career || 96 || 138 || 163 || 84.7 || 2 || 61 || 226 || 237 || 95.4 || 507 || 63.0 || 321 || 640
|}

Postseason

Personal life
On March 8, 2020, Elliott married his fiancée Annie.

References

External links
 
 Philadelphia Eagles bio
 Memphis Tigers bio

1995 births
Living people
American football placekickers
Cincinnati Bengals players
Memphis Tigers football players
National Conference Pro Bowl players
People from Western Springs, Illinois
Philadelphia Eagles players
Players of American football from Illinois
Sportspeople from Cook County, Illinois